Fabio Spiranelli (born 5 December 1999) is an Italian motorcycle racer.

Career
For 2016, Spiranelli joined the Mahindra-equipped CIP-Unicom Starker team to debut in the Moto3 World Championship. He did not score championship points in the whole season, having achieved a best result of 18th at Phillip Island.

Career statistics

Grand Prix motorcycle racing

By season

Races by year

References

External links
Profile on MotoGP.com

1999 births
Living people
Italian motorcycle racers
Moto3 World Championship riders